Alex Corporan is a Dominican-American professional skateboarder, skateboard industry professional, and event organizer, born and raised in Washington Heights, NYC. Corporan began skateboarding in 1986.

Skateboarding career 
Corporan filmed some of NYC’s first ever skate footage, helped grow the skateshop and brand; Supreme, working there as a longtime manager. Corporan made a cameo in Larry Clark's Kids. After Supreme, Corporan worked at Sole Technology, managing the Etnies showroom. He currently manages PR for brands like Rockstar Bearings & El Señor. Corporan has been part of hosting countless skateboarding events throughout his career.

Adult Go Skateboarding Day 
Corporan founded Adult Go Skateboarding Day in 2011, a yearly event thrown in New York City.

References 

American skateboarders
American sportspeople of Dominican Republic descent